Tacata may refer to:

Tácata, a town in the state of Miranda, Venezuela
"Tacata'", also known as "Tacatà" and "Tacatá", a 2012 international hit single for Tacabro

See also
Takata (disambiguation)